Église Saint-Blaise de Sindelsberg is a church in Marmoutier, Bas-Rhin, Alsace, France. Originally dated to the 12th century, it was built in 1584 and underwent renovation work in 1872. It became a registered Monument historique in 1935.

References

Churches in Bas-Rhin
Monuments historiques of Bas-Rhin
Roman Catholic churches completed in 1584
16th-century Roman Catholic church buildings in France